Philippa Saunders,  FRSE is Chair of Reproductive Steroids and Director of Postgraduate Research for the College of Medicine and Veterinary Medicine, University of Edinburgh, and Registrar of the Academy of Medical Sciences. Her research explores the mechanisms behind how sex steroids impact on repair, regeneration and cell replication throughout the body.

Early life and education
Philippa studied as an undergraduate at the University of Bristol, before moving to Darwin College, Cambridge at the University of Cambridge to complete a PhD in studying pregnancy-associated uterine proteins in the pig.

Honours and awards 
In 2019 she was elected a Fellow of the Royal Society of Edinburgh

References

Living people
Alumni of Darwin College, Cambridge
Fellows of the Academy of Medical Sciences (United Kingdom)
English physiologists
Alumni of the University of Bristol
Year of birth missing (living people)
Place of birth missing (living people)